POPin is a privately held enterprise crowdsourcing company, with headquarters located in Denver, Colorado. The company was acquired November 19, 2021 by People Before Things, LLC, a boutique coaching & consulting firm focused on organizational health and change leadership.

POPin's anonymous crowdsolving platform and mobile app are focused on the business outcomes of a company through the collaborative engagement of its employees, partners, and clients. The platform creates a micro social network around a single question for a limited period of time to address team alignment and productivity across the organization.

POPin's platform is in use by organizations in such industries as healthcare, higher education, and mass media.

Company
POPin was founded in 2014 and maintains headquarters in Denver, Colorado.

In November 2015, POPin secured $6 million in Series A funding, led by Nexus Venture Partners with participation from Greylock Partners.

See also 
 Collective problem solving
 Collective intelligence

References

External links 
 

Companies based in Orange County, California
2014 establishments in California